Laura Carter Holloway Langford (August 22, 1843 – July 10, 1930) was an American journalist, author, and lecturer from New York. She worked as a reporter and editor for the Brooklyn Eagle and published several books, notably The Ladies of the White House (1870), a group biography of the First Ladies of the United States that became a bestseller with 150,000 copies sold worldwide. A spiritualist, suffragist, and progressive who joined the Theosophical Society in the 1870s and held an array of radical and alternative beliefs, Holloway was a lifelong friend of Anna White of the Mount Lebanon Shaker Society. 

Holloway's papers are held in the Edward Deming Andrews Shaker Memorial Collection at the Winterthur Library.

References 

1843 births
1930 deaths
Writers from Nashville, Tennessee
American women journalists
20th-century American journalists
19th-century American journalists
Journalists from New York City
American women essayists
American biographers
American women non-fiction writers
American Theosophists